Wendy Elsa Greengross (29 April 1925 – 10 October 2012) was a British general practitioner and broadcaster. The Independent called her "a pioneering counsellor and one of the leading figures in fighting for equal rights for the disabled and the elderly".

Early life
Wendy Elsa Greengross was born on 29 April 1925, at 10 St Mary's Road, Golders Green, London, the daughter of Morris Philip Greengross, born Moisze Fiszel Gringross (1892–1970), a manufacturing jeweller, and his wife, Miriam Greengross, née Abrahamson (1899/1900–1968).

Her father was mayor of Holborn from 1960 to 1961, and her brother Sir Alan Greengross (born 1929) was a leading Conservative member of the Greater London Council.

Greengross was educated at South Hampstead High School from 1936 until she was evacuated to Berkhamsted, Hertfordshire, followed by University College Hospital, where she qualified as a doctor in 1949, and in 1952 won a Fulbright Scholarship to the Chicago Lying-in Hospital.

Career
Together with her husband, Greengross ran a large general practice in Tottenham, London. Opened in 1955, it was one of the UK's first group practices. She particularly promoted family planning, and they were the country's first GP practice to have a dedicated marriage guidance. Greengross worked as a GP for 35 years.

Greengross received counsellor training from the Marriage Guidance Council (now Relate), and would go on to become its Chief Medical Adviser. In the late 1960s, Greengross started teaching pastoral care and counselling at Leo Baeck College.

Greengross went into broadcasting in the early 1970s, joining the BBC Radio 4 counselling programme If You Think You've Got Problems, which ran for nearly eight years. She had her own television show on BBC1 in 1973, Let's Talk it Over.

From 1972 to 1976, Greengross was an agony aunt for The Sun, but "felt the letters passed to her were more about titillation than education".

Greengross wrote Jewish and Homosexual, published in 1980, by the Reform Synagogues of Great Britain, which "led the way towards equality within the British Reform and Liberal movements". Greengross published several sex education books, particularly focused on more marginalised groups, such as Sex and the Handicapped Child in 1980.

Greengross was a founding member and chair of the organisation Sexual Problems of Disabled People (SPOD), and a founder of the Residential Care Consortium.

Selected publications
Sex in the Middle Years (1969)
Sex in Early Marriage (1970)
Entitled to Love: the Sexual and Emotional Needs of the Handicapped (1976)
Sex and the Handicapped Child (1980)
Jewish and Homosexual (1980)
Living, Loving and Ageing (1989), with her sister-in-law Baroness Sally Greengross

Personal life
In 1951, she married a surgeon, Alex Kates, and they had five children.

Greengross had two daughters, Hilary and Polly, and three sons Nick, Richard, and Trevor (d. 1997).

Greengross lived for many years in Hampstead Garden Suburb, before a retirement flat in Regent's Park Road, where she died on 10 October 2012 of pneumonia. She was buried at Cheshunt's Jewish Cemetery.

References

1925 births
2012 deaths
People from Golders Green
People educated at South Hampstead High School
Alumni of the UCL Medical School
Pritzker School of Medicine alumni
English Jews
20th-century British women writers
English women journalists
British women columnists
The Sun (United Kingdom) people
British general practitioners
British advice columnists
English journalists
English television presenters
English radio presenters
Sex education advocates
People from Hampstead
Deaths from pneumonia in England
BBC radio presenters
BBC television presenters
British relationships and sexuality writers
British disability rights activists
British LGBT rights activists
British birth control activists
Jewish non-fiction writers
Jewish physicians
Jewish women activists
British women activists
Founders of charities
British women radio presenters
Sex educators
Judaism and sexuality
People associated with Leo Baeck College
Journalists from London
Reform Jewish feminists
20th-century English women
20th-century English people
Women civil rights activists
Fulbright alumni